UEFA U-19 Championship 2006 (Elite Round) is the second round of qualifications for the Final Tournament of UEFA U-19 Championship 2006. Spain, England, and Czech Republic automatically qualify for this round. The winners of each group join hosts Poland at the Final Tournament.

Matches

Group 1

Group 2

Group 3

Group 4

Group 5

Group 6

Group 7

See also
2006 UEFA European Under-19 Championship
2006 UEFA European Under-19 Championship qualification

Qualification Elite
UEFA European Under-19 Championship qualification